Ayer Rajah is a residential neighbourhood within the city of George Town in Penang, Malaysia. This leafy, affluent neighbourhood, situated adjacent to the Penang Botanic Gardens, mostly consists of landed properties such as bungalows and semi-detached houses, surrounded by tree-lined avenues.

Etymology 
Ayer Rajah was named after Ayer Rajah Bay, the northern bay of George Town which forms the city's northern shoreline and includes the present-day Gurney Drive.

History 
The agricultural plantation, founded by Light's Scottish partners, David Brown and James Scott, was owned by the Brown and Scott families. In particular, Scott Road, which runs through the neighbourhood, was named after James Scott.

Other prominent personalities who once resided within this neighbourhood include the first Malaysian Prime Minister, Tunku Abdul Rahman, and local DAP politician-cum-lawyer, Karpal Singh.

Transportation 
The major thoroughfares within the neighbourhood include Ayer Rajah Road (now Jalan Tunku Abdul Rahman) and Brown Road. Western Road (Jalan Utama) forms the southern end of the neighbourhood, which is also bounded by Burmah Road to the north.

Rapid Penang bus route 10 includes a handful of stops along Gottlieb Road.

Education 

The neighbourhood is served by two primary schools, three high schools and two private colleges, as well as an international school.

Primary schools
 St. Xavier's Primary Branch School
 Penang Chinese Girls' Primary School
High schools
 Convent Pulau Tikus
 Penang Chinese Girls' High School
 Penang Chinese Girls' Private High School
International school
 St. Christopher's International Primary School
Private colleges
DISTED College
 PTPL College
Aside from these institutions, the Adventist College of Nursing and Health Sciences, operated by the nearby Penang Adventist Hospital, is also situated at Burmah Road.

Health care 
The Penang Adventist Hospital, a major private hospital, is located at Burmah Road. Founded in 1924, the 253-bed hospital offers specialist treatments for a variety of medical conditions and has emerged as one of the more well-known hospitals among medical tourists in Penang.

Consulates 
Ayer Rajah is also home to a number of consulates.
 : Ayer Rajah Road
 : Burmah Road
 : Ayer Rajah Road

See also 
 Pulau Tikus
Kampong Serani
Kampung Siam

References 

Neighbourhoods in George Town, Penang